This is a list of the managers of the Turkey women's national football team, starting from the first international game in 1995 until date.

Manager history

References 

Turkey
 
Women's association football-related lists
Women's